Touching Darkness is a young adult novel by Scott Westerfeld.  The second book in his Midnighters series, it was released in 2005 through EOS Books, a now-defunct branch of HarperCollins.

Plot summary
Touching Darkness begins shortly after The Secret Hour ends. It starts with Jessica's meeting Jonathan in the secret hour. As they return home, Jonathan discovers a "stiff" - non-midnighter - outside Jessica's house, taking multiple exposures of her window across midnight. Meanwhile, Dess has been having strange dreams, which have led to some theories about co-ordinates affecting the secret hour. She discovers a GPS co-ordinate finder in her father's map drawer, and begins to use it to map the secret hour.

Investigating Jessica's stalker, Melissa overhears someone thinking about Jessica. She and Rex visit his house in the secret hour and discover people there are using dominoes with lore symbols on them to communicate with the darklings at midnight, with the help of a 'halfling' -Anathea- a girl who has been merged with a darkling.  Melissa discovers that the halfling is sick, and that the darklings will soon try to take Rex, another Seer, to replace her. They steal some of the dominoes so that the darklings will not be able to communicate about the Midnighters to their human allies. They also find that the house belongs to Ernesto Grayfoot – a cousin of Jessica's friend Constanza Grayfoot, who says that even though her grandfather used to live there, he left nearly fifty years ago – around the time the Midnighters seem to have disappeared from Bixby – and now the rest of her family avoid the town at all costs – her father was even cut off for moving there.

Meanwhile, Dess discovers a house in which another Midnighter – Madeline – has lived hidden for nearly fifty years. Madeline explains that fifty years ago, when the town's population boomed suddenly, someone let out the secret of the Midnighters to an outsider - Constanza's grandfather - who learned how to communicate with the darklings, and got rich doing their bidding. The darklings used him to kill off the Midnighters, leaving only the new, younger generation, who were seen as harmless with no one older to teach them. They also made the halfling using a young girl called Anathea, to communicate with the darklings better. She also explains that her house is in a contortion in the secret hour which hides her, and that Dess must keep the knowledge of it hidden from the others so that the darklings do not find it.

After ransacking Constanza's house, the Midnighters learn that the darklings are trying to prevent a new runway being built outside Bixby. From Madeline, Dess learns that she needs to get Jessica's help in scouring the site of the runway with light: it is the only place halflings can be made, and light will destroy it. However, before she manages it, Rex is kidnapped. Dess draws a map to where they will find him, then suppresses the memories using a trick Madeline taught her so that Melissa will not learn about Madeline from her mind. However, Melissa suspects Dess is hiding something, and touches her, giving herself full access to Dess's memories. She learns about Madeline, and Dess begins to resent her for the intrusion on her privacy.

When the secret hour begins, Jonathan, Melissa, Jessica and Dess are only a mile from the spot Rex has been taken, but Melissa is injured when she continues through the windshield when the car stops abruptly at the start of the secret hour. Jessica and Jonathan go ahead and find Anathea, freed from the darkling, who tells them that Rex is already a halfling. Luckily, they catch up with him, and Jessica uses her torch to burn away the darkling flesh, making him (mostly) human again. They return to Anathea, who dies from the darkness after Jonathan grants her last wish to fly again. They leave her in front of the Grayfoots, along with a message spelled out in English: 'You're next'.

Finally, Madeline introduces herself to all of the Midnighters - as soon as Melissa knew about her, the darklings could read it from her mind. She begins to teach Melissa how to mindcast properly. Meanwhile, Rex is struggling to come to terms with his enhanced abilities; his time as a halfling has left him with the darkling's ability to sense human thoughts and emotions, as well as a desire to hunt.

References

Westerfeld, S. (2004). Touching Darkness, London: Atom.

2005 American novels
American fantasy novels
American science fiction novels
American young adult novels

Contemporary fantasy novels
HarperCollins books
Novels by Scott Westerfeld